José Planas is the name of:

José Planas Artés (1901–1977), Spanish football manager
José Planas Planas (born 1952), Spanish footballer